Marc Nordqvist (born 1 June 1997) is a Finnish footballer who plays as a goalkeeper.

Club career
Nordqvist spent time on trial with then-Championship side Watford in 2015.

In the summer of 2018 he went on a half-season loan to FK Jerv of the Norwegian second tier.

Career statistics

Club

Notes

International

References

External links
 

1997 births
Living people
Swedish-speaking Finns
Finnish footballers
Finland under-21 international footballers
Association football goalkeepers
IFK Mariehamn players
Veikkausliiga players
Kakkonen players
People from Mariehamn
FC Åland players
FK Jerv players
Finnish expatriate footballers
Expatriate footballers in Norway
Finnish expatriate sportspeople in Norway
Sportspeople from Åland